Catascopia terebra (Westerlund, 1885) (formerly known as Catascopia occulta) is a species of air-breathing freshwater snail, an aquatic pulmonate gastropod mollusk in the family Lymnaeidae, the pond snails.

Taxonomy
Some authors classify this species as Stagnicola terebra, because the genus Catascopia Meier-Brook & Bargues, 2002 should not be distinguished based on DNA analysis only (genera should be distinguished morphologically and anatomically).

Distribution 
This species of snail is found in the Czech Republic in two localities only: in a small temporary pool near Kladruby nad Labem in the Eastern Bohemia and in temporary pool near the inflow of the Dyje River into the Morava river in Moravia, Germany, Poland and other areas.

Habitat 
It inhabits freshwater bodies.

References

Lymnaeidae